St. Adalbert Parish, in Hyde Park, Massachusetts, United States, was a Catholic parish designated for Polish immigrants in the Archdiocese of Boston.  The church was closed in 2011.

The architect for the 1450 River Street church was Harrison H. Atwood of Boston.

Bibliography 

 Our Lady of Czestochowa Parish - Centennial 1893-1993
 The Official Catholic Directory in USA

See also 
 Polish-American Roman Catholic parishes in New England

External links 

 St. Adalbert - Diocesan information
 St. Adalbert - ParishesOnline.com
 St. Adalbert - TheCatholicDirectory.com 
 Archdiocese of Boston

Roman Catholic parishes of Archdiocese of Boston
Polish-American Roman Catholic parishes in Massachusetts